Kyiv Arsenal January Uprising, sometimes called simply the January Uprising or the January Rebellion, was the Bolshevik-organized workers' armed revolt that started on January 29, 1918, at the Arsenal Factory in Kyiv during the Soviet–Ukrainian War. The goal of the uprising was to sabotage the ongoing elections to the Ukrainian Constituent Assembly and to support the advancing Red Army.

The beginning

January events in Russia and Ukraine
The long-anticipated 1918 Ukrainian Constituent Assembly election was to be held on January 9, 1918, where the Bolsheviks won only 10% of the total votes, but the elections were suspended due to the ongoing Ukrainian-Soviet War as practically all of left-bank Ukraine was occupied by the Soviet forces headed by Vladimir Antonov-Ovseyenko. According to the Third Declaration (Universal), the Constituent Assembly was planned to meet on January 22, but this was postponed until the end of military conflict. On January 19, the Soviet government dissolved the Russian Constituent Assembly, while just a day prior, the government state security forces (Cheka) opened fire on a peace demonstration in support of the constituent assembly. On January 22, another peace demonstration in Moscow was dispersed by gunfire as well.

Preceding revolutionary events
The Kyivan Bolsheviks decided not to waste any more time and were planning for a revolt to support the invading Soviet forces in the Soviet–Ukrainian War. They decided to initiate it once the Soviet forces started to approach the city in order to draw away some of the Ukrainian military forces from the front lines and help the Red Army to advance. The Bolsheviks had used this tactic in other Ukrainian cities, such as Katerynoslav (current Dnipro), Odessa, Mykolaiv, and Yelizavetgrad (current Kropyvnytskyi). The Arsenal Factory was chosen to be the center of the riot. To prevent any riots on January 18, a few platoons of the Free Cossacks confiscated a great amount of weaponry from the factory and arrested several Communist activists. The Kyivan Bolsheviks' propaganda newspaper, Golos Sotsial-Demokrata, was shut down. Later it was decided to confiscate the coal ore to completely shut down the factory.

Organisation of the revolt
On January 28, the Bolsheviks instigated a protest and decided to resist further developments against the factory. With the help of some of the soldiers from the Shevchenko Regiment that were guarding the warehouse of weapons confiscated earlier, they managed to retrieve them back to the factory. After a brief gathering, it was decided to start the revolt immediately. The leaders of the revolutionaries were Syla Mishchenko (commandant), Oleksandr Horwits, Mykola Kostyuk, and Ipolit Fialek. The city's Bolsheviks Jan Hamarnyk, Andriy Ivanov, Isaac Kreisberg, and others, who had been planning to delay the uprising until the Red Army would come closer to Kyiv, had no other choice but to follow it. The headquarters of the revolt were established at 47 Velyka Vasylkivska Street. The same night on January 28, several factories, together with some of soldiers from the Bohdaniv Regiment, Shevchenko Regiment, and Sahaydachny Regiment, joined the Arsenal workers in the January Uprising. The goal of the uprising was to encircle the building of the Central Rada (today the Pedagogical museum) and then force the members of the Rada to resign. Along the way, they were joined by other Red Guards of Podil and Shulyavka, led by Arkadiy Dzedzievski (Left SR) with Makola Patlakh (Bolshevik) and Vasyl Bozhenko at Demiivka.

Opposing forces

Bolsheviks
 1st battalion (kurin) of Sahaidachny Regiment (Syla Mishchenko)
 Several units of Bohdaniv battalion (kurin) (Kysel)
 Units of Shevchenko Regiment (warrant officer A. Port)
 Red Guards units of Arsenal Factory
 Red Guards units of Demiivka artillery factory (Vasyl Bozhenko)

Central Rada
 Sich Riflemen battalion (kurin) (Yevhen Konovalets)
 2nd platoon (sotnia) – 200 soldiers
 Machine-gun platoon (sotnia) – 150 soldiers
 Reserve platoon (sotnia) – 100 soldiers
 Artillery battery – 12 guns 
 Free Cossacks units
 Haidamaka Brigade of Sloboda Ukraine (kish) (Symon Petlyura)
 Black Haidamaka Battalion (kurin)
 Red Haidamaka Battalion (kurin), also known as 3rd Haidamaka Regiment (Omelian Volokh)
 1st platoon (of Sich Riflemen battalion) – 200 soldiers
 Hordiyenko Regiment (Vsevolod Petriv)
 Some armored trains

Revolt
On the morning of January 29, the representative of the Kyivan council of worker and soldier deputies handed over an ultimatum to the Tsentralna Rada to surrender. In return, the Rada requested immediate capitulation of the revolutionaries, and by evening the city was engulfed in a series of skirmishes. The main forces of the mutineers were concentrated around the factory, although a few separate centers existed in the Shuliavka neighborhood (based on the recently liquidated Shuliavka Republic), Demiivka, and Podil. The revolutionaries managed to overtake the railroad freight station Kiev-Tovarniy and were moving towards the center of the city through Khreschatyk. The most dangerous were activities in Podil, when the mutineers managed to take the Starokiev police precinct and the hotel Prague (today 36 Volodymyr Street), which were close to the building of the Tsentralna Rada. The next day on January 30, the whole city was paralyzed and went on strike, stopping utility services and the city's transportation. The Rada had no influence over most of the military units, many of which decided not to intrude. The Ukrainian government was supported only by the separate platoons of the Bohdaniv Regiment, Polubotko Regiment, Bohun Regiment, a kurin of Sich Riflemen, and the Free Cossacks.

Storming the Arsenal
On February 1, the Rada announced that it had full control of the city and asked the workers to end the strike, as it harmed the civil population. It promised to come up with several socioeconomic reforms in the immediate future. The next day, the Sloboda Ukraine Kish (Haidamaky) of Symon Petliura entered the city, withdrawing from the attacks of the Colonel Muravyov. Also the Hordiyenko Regiment of Vsevolod Petrov was brought to the city from the north front. On February 2, most of the revolt was extinguished except for its main center – the Arsenal Factory. On the morning of February 4, the forces of Symon Petliura occupied the factory after a bloody assault that cost the lives of several kish soldiers and workers of Arsenal. Later, Soviets would claim that the Petliura forces killed 300 of the Arsenal's defenders in the yard of the factory.

Afterwards, Petliura's resistance was weakened greatly against the besieging Bolsheviks, who entered the city on February 4 (occupying the Darnytsia neighborhood) and captured the town on February 7 (although sporadic fighting continued for several days afterwards).

Legacy
This event is generally regarded as "class-motivated" by historians, similarly to other workers' movements of Russia at the time.

To commemorate the event, the historic defensive wall of the Arsenal Factory bearing the traces of shelling was preserved by Soviet authorities on the city's Moscow Street (near the Arsenalna metro station). The nearby street named for the event during Soviet times carried this name (January Uprising Street) until 2007.

The uprising is the subject of Arsenal (1929), a Soviet war film by the Ukrainian director Oleksandr Dovzhenko.

See also
 Kiev Bolshevik Uprising

References

External links
Arsenal (1929): Ukraine in Revolution
Yaroslav Tynchenko. First Ukrainian-Bolshevik War (December 1917 — March 1918) — Kyiv-Lviv, 1996.
Manchuk, A. The January Uprising. The role of boys. (Січневе повстання. "Роля хлопчаків"). Ukrayinska Pravda (Istorychna Pravda). 29 January 2011.
Derevyany, I. Sich Riflemen during the January Uprising ("Січові стрільці під час Січневого повстання"). Ukrayinska Pravda (Istorychna Pravda). 6 April 2012.
Zdorov, A. Who raised the armed revolt in Kiev in January of 1918. Ukrayinska Pravda (Istorychna Pravda). 18 October 2010.
Kiev January Armed Uprising in 1918 at the Ukrainian Soviet Encyclopedia

1910s in Kyiv
Political history of Ukraine
1918 in Ukraine
Conflicts in 1918
Bolshevik uprisings
Communism in Ukraine
Russian Revolution in Ukraine
Military history of Kyiv
January 1918 events
February 1918 events